The National Slate Museum (previously known as the Welsh Slate Museum and the North Wales Quarrying Museum) is located at Gilfach Ddu, the 19th-century workshops of the now disused Dinorwic quarry, within the Padarn Country Park, Llanberis, Gwynedd. The museum is dedicated to the preservation and display of relicts of the Slate industry in Wales.

The museum is an anchor point of the European Route of Industrial Heritage (ERIH) and part of Amgueddfa Cymru – National Museum Wales.

History 
The workshops which served the needs of the quarry and its locomotives, were built in 1870 on land created from the continuous tipping of spoil from the adjacent Vivian Quarry, and as a replacement for the store sheds which were previously sited there. Rail access to the works was by both  narrow gauge (the quarry gauge) and  narrow gauge (that of the Padarn Railway which carried the slate from the quarry to Port Dinorwic). Rails also entered the main yard through the main entrance.

The quarry closed in 1969 and the site was opened on 25 May 1972 as the North Wales Quarrying Museum.

The museum is now connected to the nearby village of Llanberis by the Llanberis Lake Railway, which uses part of the building as its workshops.

The museum reopened after receiving a £1.6 million grant from the Heritage Lottery Fund and now has displays featuring Victorian era slateworkers' cottages that once stood at Tanygrisiau, near  Blaenau Ffestiniog. They were taken down stone by stone and re-erected on the site. The museum includes the multi-media display, To Steal a Mountain, showing the lives and work of the men who quarried slate here.

The museum also has the largest working waterwheel in mainland Britain, which is available for viewing via several walkways. Close to the museum is the partly restored Vivian incline, a gravity balance incline where loaded slate wagons haul empty wagons back up.

Locomotives 
The museum owns a number of locomotives from Welsh quarries

References

External links

 National Slate Museum
 National Slate Museum World Heritae Site
 

European Route of Industrial Heritage Anchor Points
History of Gwynedd
National museums of Wales
Slate industry in Wales
Industry museums in Wales
Mining museums in Gwynedd
Museums in Snowdonia
Museums in Gwynedd
Llanddeiniolen
Articles containing video clips
1972 establishments in Wales
Museums established in 1972